Stacey Pheffer Amato (born March 19, 1966) is a member of the New York State Assembly, representing the 23rd district, which includes portions of Queens. A Democrat, Pheffer Amato was first elected in 2016.

Early life and career
Pheffer Amato was born in Rockaway, Queens. Prior to holding office, she worked as an education paraprofessional for the New York City Department of Education and as a procurement analyst for the FDNY and the New York City Department of Sanitation. She holds a bachelor's degree in business economics from the State University of New York at Oneonta. She has been an active member of the Rockaway Beach Civic Association for years and is a committee member of the NY Rising Community Reconstruction Program, which is tasked with overseeing the state's recovery efforts from Hurricane Sandy.

Elections
In 2016, Assemblymember Phillip Goldfeder announced abruptly that he would retire. Pheffer Amato soon after announced that she would seek the Democratic nomination. With support from the Queens County Democratic Party, she was unopposed in the primary. She defeated Republican Alan N. Zwirn in the 2016 general election, 68% to 32%, to take the seat. She was easily re-elected in 2018.

In 2022, Pheffer Amato defeated her Republican opponents by just 15 votes. She was not declared the winner until January 2023, two months after the election.

State Assembly
In the Assembly, she is the Chair on the Subcommittee on Child Product Safety. Her mother, Queens County Clerk Audrey Pheffer, previously held this Assembly seat. Upon Pheffer Amato's election, they became the first mother-daughter team to hold the same seat in the New York State Legislature.

Personal life
Pheffer Amato and her husband, Frank, live in Rockaway Beach with their two children.

References

External links
New York State Assemblymember Stacey Pheffer Amato official site

Living people
Democratic Party members of the New York State Assembly
People from Queens, New York
21st-century American politicians
21st-century American women politicians
Women state legislators in New York (state)
1966 births